A New Car Assessment Program (or Programme) is a government car safety program tasked with evaluating new automobile designs for performance against various safety threats.

History
The first NCAP was created in 1979, by the United States National Highway Traffic Safety Administration. This program was established in response to Title II of the Motor Vehicle Information and Cost Savings Act of 1972, to encourage manufacturers to build safer vehicles and consumers to buy them. Over time, the agency improved the program by adding rating programs, facilitating access to test results, and revising the format of the information to make it easier for consumers to understand. NHTSA asserts the program has influenced manufacturers to build vehicles that consistently achieve high ratings.

The first standardized, 35 mph front crash test was May 21, 1979, and the first results were released October 15 that year.

The European program, Euro NCAP, was founded in 1997 by the Transport Research Laboratory for the UK Department for Transport and backed by several European governments, as well as by the European Union. Based in Brussels, Belgium, the European program was modeled on the American program.
Other areas with similar programmes include Australia and New Zealand with ANCAP, Latin America with Latin NCAP and China with C-NCAP. Plans for a Bharat New Vehicle Safety Assessment Program for India have been discussed, but as an interim, Global NCAP has been performing consumer crash tests on popular Indian models, as part of its Safer Cars for India research project. Similarly, Global NCAP conducts crash tests in South Africa, under its Safer Cars for Africa project. In Russia, the AutoReview Car Assessment Programme (ARCAP) has been conducting consumer crash tests but is not recognised as an NCAP and often uses subjective evaluation methods on a case-to-case basis.

In the 2000s, the American agency sought to improve the dissemination of NCAP ratings and as a result of the Safe, Accountable, Flexible, Efficient Transportation Equity Act: A Legacy for Users (SAFETEA–LU). It did so by issuing a Final Rule requiring manufacturers to place NCAP star ratings on the Monroney sticker (automobile price sticker). The rule has a September 1, 2007 compliance date.

In 2022, under the Infrastructure Law and reacting to recommendations from the Alliance for Automotive Innovation, the American agency introduced a new proposal for updating its version of NCAP. The proposal included four new technologies in driver assistance - Blind spot monitoring and intervention, electronic lane-keeping, and computerized emergency braking systems protecting pedestrians. This was the first time NCAP addressed the safety of individuals outside of a vehicle. The proposal also makes provision for a 10-year road map to keep up with the latest innovation and technology.

In June 2022, the US NCAP received criticism from the National Transportation Safety Board which considers that the 5-Star Safety Rating Program that Americans use “fails consumers” by not including collision avoidance system and other technologies. When compared to the European Euro NCAP, the NHTSA rating system lacks forward collision warning and automatic emergency braking systems, lane departure warning systems, driver monitoring systems, and other active and passive component designed to also protect pedestrians and bicyclists, according to NTSB.

Organisations
Different NCAPs are:

References

External links 
 NCAP Test Protocols and other Information